Lương Thị Thu Thương (born 1 May 2000) is a Vietnamese footballer who plays as a centre-back or a sweeper for Vietnam Women's Championship club Than Khoáng Sản and the Vietnamese national team.

References

External links

2000 births
Living people
Women's association football defenders
Vietnamese women's footballers
Vietnam women's international footballers
21st-century Vietnamese women